Alexander Taylor (born 13 June 1962) is a Scottish former footballer who played as a midfielder.

Career
Taylor began his career with Dundee United and played over thirty league games for the Tannadice team before leaving for Hamilton Academical in 1986. During his time at Douglas Park, Taylor picked up a Scottish First Division winners' medal and was crowned the SPFA Players' Player of the Year for the First Division before heading to Walsall in 1988. Taylor returned to Scotland in 1990 with Falkirk and went on to make just over fifty league appearances for the Bairns. After spending the latter part of the 1992-93 season on loan at Partick Thistle, Taylor moved there permanently after the summer, playing sixty-three league matches over a two-year period. Similar spells with Raith Rovers, Ross County and Forfar Athletic followed, with Taylor picking up a Scottish Third Division winners' medal during his time with County. After leaving Forfar in January 2001, Taylor was training with Airdrie but failed to win a deal as the club were struggling with severe financial issues. Taylor subsequently retired from professional football and now runs a number of businesses in Hamilton and Kirkcaldy.

Honours
SPFA Players' Player of the Year (First Division): 1
 1987-88
Scottish First Division: 1
 1987-88
Scottish Third Division: 1
 1998-99

References

External links

1962 births
Footballers from Glasgow
Living people
Dundee United F.C. players
Hamilton Academical F.C. players
Walsall F.C. players
Falkirk F.C. players
Partick Thistle F.C. players
Raith Rovers F.C. players
Ross County F.C. players
Forfar Athletic F.C. players
Scottish Football League players
Scottish footballers
Association football midfielders
English Football League players